The  is a Japanese international school in Vasant Kunj, Delhi.

See also
 Japanese people in India

Indian schools in Japan:
 Global Indian International School, Tokyo Campus
 India International School in Japan
 Little Angels International School

Notes

Further reading
  杉原 大樹 (ニューデリー日本人学校), 村山 昌夫 (ニューデリー日本人学校), and 小林 倫代 (国立特別支援教育総合研究所教育相談部). "ニューデリー日本人学校における校内支援体制の実際 : 一人ひとりに寄せた細やかな支援・指導を目指して" (Archive). 国立特別支援教育総合研究所教育相談年報 29, 19–22, 2008–06. National Institute of Special Needs Education (独立行政法人国立特別支援教育総合研究所). See profile at CiNii.

External links

 Japanese School New Delhi 

International schools in Delhi
New Delhi
New Delhi